The Calgary Spurs were a Junior A ice hockey team in the Alberta Junior Hockey League.  Founded in 1972 as The Pass Red Devils and following a two-year stop as the Pincher Creek Panthers, the franchise became the second AJHL franchise in Calgary (along with the Calgary Canucks) in 1978 as the Calgary Chinooks.  The team became the Spurs one year later, retaining the name until the franchise went bankrupt in 1990.  The assets of the defunct Spurs franchise were purchased by new investors and recreated as the Calgary Royals. As the Spurs, the team won two regular season titles in the AJHL, but never captured a playoff championship.

Season-by-season record
Note: GP = Games played, W = Wins, L = Losses, T = Ties, Pts = Points, GF = Goals for, GA = Goals against

See also
 List of ice hockey teams in Alberta
 Ice hockey in Calgary

References
Alberta Junior Hockey League website
AJHL Annual Guide & Record Book 2006-07

Defunct Alberta Junior Hockey League teams
Defunct ice hockey teams in Alberta
Spurs, Calgary
Ice hockey clubs established in 1978
Ice hockey clubs disestablished in 1990
1978 establishments in Alberta
1990 disestablishments in Alberta